Siemensdamm is a station on the Berlin U-Bahn line U7, located in the Spandau district. It was opened on 1 October 1980 (designed by R.G.Rümmler) with the line's extension from Richard-Wagner-Platz to Rohrdamm. The station is named after an arterial street, which itself is named after Werner von Siemens. The company he founded, Siemens AG, has many facilities in the station's surroundings.

The station is constructed as a "Multi-Purpose Facility". It is prepared and partially stocked to be used as an NBC shelter.  It is specified to sustain 4,332 people for 14 days. The next station is Halemweg.

References

U7 (Berlin U-Bahn) stations
Buildings and structures in Spandau
Railway stations in Germany opened in 1980